Aviation is the third and final studio album of the New York-based alternative rock band Semi Precious Weapons. It was released on April 22, 2014 by RedZone Records.

Track listing

References

External links
iTunes Download Link  at iTunes

2014 albums
Semi Precious Weapons albums